SGF may mean:

 Smart Game Format, a computer file format
 Société générale de financement, Québeca, Canada
 Sovereign Grace Fellowship of Canada, for Baptist churches
 Springfield–Branson National Airport, Springfield, Missouri, US, IATA code
 The Spaceguard Foundation, to protect Earth from collisions with astronomical objects